Christmas tree coral may refer to:
Antipathes dendrochristos, a species of black coral
Studeriotes longiramosa, a species of soft coral

Animal common name disambiguation pages